Bruno Aveillan (born 1968) is a French filmmaker, photographer, and contemporary artist.

Communication art 
After graduating from Ecole Supérieure des Beaux Arts in Toulouse, he joined Quad Productions in Paris in 1995. Since then, he has directed short experimental movies and international commercials for clients such as Orange, Chanel, Cartier, Lanvin, Perrier, Louis Vuitton, Audi, Nike, Paco Rabanne, Shangrila, Lexus, Guerlain, Rochas, Jaguar, Samsung, Nissan, Time Warner, Volvo, Miller, Nintendo, Coca-Cola, BMW etc.

In 1999, succeeding the directors  Lars von Trier and Roland Joffé, Aveillan directed the new episode in the advertising sage for CNP. Additionally, he directed the launch commercial for Lanvin perfume "Oxygène". It is during this spot that Gisele Bündchen makes her debut on screen. During his career Aveillan has also filmed world-renowned stars such as Monica Bellucci, Rachel Weisz, Freida Pinto, Natalia Vodianova, Claudia Schiffer, Shalom Harlow, Karlie Kloss, Lara Stone, Natasha Poly, Liya Kebede, Amy Smart, Tina Balthazar, Sharon Stone, Catherine Hurley, Milla Jovovich, Leila Bekhti, Jessica Stam, Bianca Balti, Inna Zobova, Louise Pedersen, Julia Stegner, Estelle Lefébure, Elsa Benitez, Mylène Farmer, Morgane Dubled, Vlada Roslyakova, Sunniva Stordahl, Virginie Ledoyen, etc.

Aveillan has also directed a series of commercials for Thermasilk. His spot for Nissan-Infinity "Athem" was presented during the premiere of the  2002 Oscar ceremony. Alongside Martin Scorsese and Oliver Stone, Aveillan has directed four commercials for the launch of the brand Orange. He has worked in collaboration with the Land Artist Nils Udo to create visual worlds for the perfume Mahora from Guerlain. In 2006, he also worked with fashion designer Olivier Theyskens for the launch of the new Rochas Fragrance (Starring Model Jessica Stam).

His commercial for Magnum, "5 senses", was directed in an experimental manner and has received international acclaim (including Montreux Gold Award and European Effie Award).

He directed a Flash-animated television series and the television commercial series called Robotskin for Philips in 2007.

In 2008, Aveillan directed the first ever brand campaign for Louis Vuitton: "Where will life take you" (90" format, translated into 14 languages). This spot evokes "the soul of travel". It has received 14 international awards including 2008 Gold Clio Award, Gold Award at the 2008 London International Awards, Epica, Cristal. The music was composed by Gustavo Santaolalla.

In 2009, the Musée des Arts Décoratifs at the Louvre had a retrospective of his work within their major exhibition devoted to cinema in advertising.

In 2010, he shot the first brand film for Shangri-La that metaphorically presents a philosophy imbued by generosity and humanism. This spot and tells the story of a man who has been adopted and saved by wolves. In 2011, Swarovski enlisted directly Aveillan to create a cinema short movie that would conjure Swarovski’s more than one-hundred-year heritage on the big screen, which was premiered at Time Square NYC, on 1 January.

In beginning of 2012, the House of Cartier announced the international release of its first brand film  L'Odyssee de Cartier, a three-and-one-half minute film directed by Aveillan.  The short film, which chronicles Cartier's 165-year history, was first screened at The Metropolitan Museum of Art in New York City on 29 February 2012.   This film has been seen by 180 million viewers around the globe and has received more than 40 gold awards, notably a Golden Lion in Cannes.

In 2013, Aveillan's photographic and Art work was published in the VICTOR Book edited by Hasselblad, alongside artists and photographers like Alec Soth, Steve McCurry or David Hockney.

In 2017, Aveillan directed a campaign for French Road Safety which was the most awarded campaign of the year with more than 39 international awards around the globe, including 6 Lions Cannes and the title of "Best ad of the year in France".

Aveillan supports the action of NGO such as Reporters without Borders, Paralympic games  and the Food bank for whom he has shot several films. He's also an ambassador of The Heart Fund.

Cinema
In 2013 Aveillan was developing a feature film project with Universal, a modern fairy tale based on the Cinderella story, with Ann Peacock as a writer.

In 2015 Aveillan was set as director of Hansel & Gretel: Witch Hunters 2.

Documentary
In 2017, Aveillan directed an experimental 60 mn documentary film about French sculptor Rodin, produced by Arte and RMN. The film was premiered at The Grand Palais in April 2017 in Paris at the occasion of the opening of the Centennial exhibition of Rodin. It was then screened at Stanford University, San Francisco; Loyola University, Los Angeles; National Museum of Western Art, Tokyo; Barnes Foundation, Philadelphia; Fundación Mapfre Casa Garriga Nogués, Barcelona; Art Gallery of South Australia, Adelaide.

Awards
 From 1995 to 2017, the awards include: Gold Lion Cannes, AEAF Award, Gold Clio Awards, Golden Globe New York, Grand Prix Stratégie, Art Director Club (France, UK, Italy, Germany), Gold London International Awards, Gold AdFest, TV Gold ADDY's, Gold New York Festival, Toucan d'Or, Art & Technology award, EuroEffies, Ad Masters, European Film Cristal, Gold Eurobest, Ars Electronica, Gold Epica, Grand prix and Gold Mobius award, Gold Werbefilmpreis, Golden award of Montreux, Siggraph, Gold Spike Awards
 2014, Aveillan received a "Lifetime Achievement Award" at La Jolla International Fashion Film Award à San Diego, for "Global Excellence"

Exhibitions
As a multimédia artist, Aveillan's body of work ranges from photography, experimental movies, video works, and installations. Aveillan's work has been featured in solo and group exhibitions.

 Group
 2002, Parcours 21. Galerie Pin-up Paris.
 2004, Autoportraits. Galerie Pin-up Paris.
 2006, Silver Lake Film Festival. Los Angeles.
 2007, DFA's 35th. Dance Film Association Inc. New York.
 2007, Independent Film Show 2007. EM Arts Naples.
 2007, Dance for the Camera. Film Society of Lincoln Center New York.
 2007, Hustler of culture. Chicago Department of Cultural Affairs Chicago.
 2007, DIAF 2007. International Arts Festival Dehli.
 2007, ROMP !. Suddenly Dance Theatre Victoria BC.
 2007, DKF Muranow. Wprost i Kultura Varsovie.
 2009, 1968–2008, 40 ans de films publicitaires à la télévision. Musée des Arts Décoratifs Paris-Louvre.
 2010, Parcours céramique - La scène française contemporaine. Musée des Arts Décoratifs Paris-Louvre.
 2011, CUTLOG, International Contemporary Art Fair, Paris.
 2011, THE OTHERS, International Contemporary Art Fair, Turin.
 2012, OFF BRUSSELS, International Contemporary Art Fair, Brussels.
 2012, CUTLOG, International Contemporary Art Fair, Paris.
 2013, CUTLOG NYC, International Contemporary Art Fair, New York.
 2013, CUTLOG, International Contemporary Art Fair, Paris.
 2014, CUTLOG NYC, International Contemporary Art Fair, New York.
 2015, OUTSIDE, Galerie A, Paris.
 2015, NARCISSE, Walter Benjamin art contemporary center, Perpignan.

 Solo
 2008, DIOTOPES. Galerie Léo Scheer Paris.
 2008, DIOTOPES II. Galerie Léo Scheer, Paris.
 2010, MNEMO#LUX. Camera Work Gallery, Berlin.
 2011, L'AVANT SCÈNE. Museum of Contemporary Art, Cognac.
 2011, FASCINATIO - FULGURATIO. Galerie spree, Paris.
 2012, LUMIERES, IMPRESSIONS. Festival Visa Off, Perpignan (Guest Honnor).
 2012, BOLSHOI UNDERGROUND. Galerie Spree, Paris.
 2013, MINOTAUR-Ex. LOOP Barcelona, Barcelone.
 2013, ACETATE SPIRIT. Galerie Spree, Paris.
 2014, BOLSHOI UNDERGROUND & ALTRE STORIES, Curated by Francesco Gattuso, Galeria Centro Steccata, Milano.
 2014, BRUNO AVEILLAN, RETROSPECTIVE OF A WORLD MASTER, Museum of Contemporary Art of San Diego (MoCA).
 2015, ISOLATION CEREMONY, Curated by Olga Sveblova, Multimedia Art Museum Moscow (MAMM).
 2015, 3 + 1,  Art Paris Art Fair, Grand Palais, Paris.
 2015, FLASHBACK,  Couvent des Minimes, Perpignan.
 2017, L'HYPOTHèSE du PHOTON,  A GALERY, Bruxelles.

Bibliography
  ROLAND GARROS by BRUNO AVEILLAN, Éditions de la Martinière.
  ACETATE SPIRIT, Editions NOIR. 
  The Red Book, Editions NOIR. 
  Prodigy of the Architect, Editions NOIR. 
  VICTOR, Editions Hasselblad
  BOLSHOI UNDERGROUD, Éditions Au-Delà du Raisonnable. Collection Les littératures visuelles. 
  FASCINATIO, Editions Higgins
  FULGURATIO, Editions Higgins
  MNEMO#LUX, Kerber Verlag Ed., Collection PhotoArt. 
  Diotopes, Léo Sheer Ed. . 
  Parcours 21, Studio Pin Up Ed.
  Autoportraits, Studio Pin Up Ed.

References

  Gérard Lefort, « Apocalypse bulles », in Libération , January 4, 1998
  Laurence Armengau, "B. Aveillan : l'idée c'est ce qui vieillit le moins vite", in CB News, June 22, 1998
  C.L., "XS by Bruno Aveillan", in Elle, December 9, 1998
  Gérard Leford, "Le rêve et la Ricoré", in Libération , May 8, 1999
  Patricia Winters Lauro, "Thermasilk enters the realm of fairy tales, dragons and special effects", in The New York Times , May 8, 2000
  Kathy Desalvo " Director Bruno Aveillan crafts Fantastic - and heated - story", in Shoot , May 18, 2001
  Therese Balduzzi « Directors on Top : Bruno Aveillan », in Boards magazine , May 1, 2002
  Anne Rose Schlutbohm "A whiff of perfume", in Archive, January 2004
  M.P.« GDF : un savoir-faire révélé en beauté », in Le Figaro, May 3, 2004
  Markus Albert "Sin and sensuality", in Archive, February 2005
  Liza Klaussmann "Creatives on verge : Bruno Aveillan", in Variety, June 2006
  Stephane Zissu "Zom Art : Bruno Aveillan", in Kromag 04  , May 2007
  Shots "AVEILLAN'S EMOTIONAL BAGGAGE", in Shots 6 February 2008 , 6 February 2008
  Clément Ghis Louis Vuitton fait son cinéma, in Libération Next, 22 February 2008 
  Jérome Beglé Culture Evènement : M. Farmer comme vous ne l'avez jamais vue, in Paris Match, 3 July 2008
  Michael Kimmelman, Arts : In France Ads Aim at Heart..., in The New York Times, 18 February 2009 
  Stephen Whelan, Fleetings Moments, in Shots # 113, February 2009 
  Justin Kroll "U taps scribe for Cinderella rethink", in Variety, Sep 2011
  Maddalena Fossati "Minuti preziosi", in Vanity Fair, March 2012
  Gabriel Beltrone"Jewelry house storms three major networks in prime time with Bruno Aveillan's fantastical history lesson", in ADWEEK, March 2012 
  "Bruno Aveillan's "L'Odysée" for Cartier Dazzles the Ad Industry", in SourceEcreative, March 2012 
  Raphaelle Elkrief Le luxe se met en scène, in Le Monde.fr, 23 Mars 2012 
  Television : Interview of Bruno Aveillan in La vie des médias on TF1.  December 21, 2003 (Archives INA)
  Radio : Interview of Bruno Aveillan by Philip Dodd in Night Waves on BBC.  April 9, 2012

1968 births
French film directors
Living people